National Association may refer to:

Politics
 National Association (South Korea), a political party 1946–1960
 Kokumin Kyōkai or National Association, a Japanese political party 1892–1899

Sports
Unless noted otherwise, each of the below is or was based in the United States

Baseball
 National Association of Base Ball Players (1857–1870), the governing body of early high-level but officially non-professional baseball
 National Association of Professional Base Ball Players (1871–1875), regarded by baseball historians as the first professional baseball league
 National Association (1879–1880), successor to the International Association after it lost its final Canadian team
 National Association of Professional Baseball Leagues (NAPBL), the former name of the governing body of Minor League Baseball, established in 1901
 National Association of Colored Baseball Clubs of the United States and Cuba (1907–1910), an early professional Negro baseball league

Other
 National Association of Basketball Coaches, an organization of men's college basketball coaches
 National Association of Collegiate Directors of Athletics, a professional organization for college and university athletic directors
 National Association Football League, a semi-professional soccer league (1895–1898)

Acronym usage
 NAACP (National Association for the Advancement of Colored People), a civil rights organization in the United States
 NAIA (National Association of Intercollegiate Athletics), a college athletics association for colleges and universities in North America
 NASCAR (National Association for Stock Car Auto Racing), an American auto racing sanctioning and operating company
 Nasdaq (National Association of Securities Dealers Automated Quotations Stock Market), an American stock exchange

Other
 National Association, or "N.A.", the official designation of federally chartered banks in the United States
 National Association of Letter Carriers, an American labor union
 National Association of Realtors, an American trade association

See also